Thiago Gabriel Rodrigues Paz, commonly known as Thiago (born 26 August 1981), is a Brazilian born, Azerbaijani futsal player who plays for Araz Naxçivan and the Azerbaijan national futsal team.

References

External links
UEFA profile

1981 births
Living people
Futsal forwards
Azerbaijani men's futsal players
Brazilian men's futsal players
Brazilian emigrants to Azerbaijan